Germán Lesman (born 8 September 1990) is an Argentine footballer. His last club was Villa Dálmine.

External links
 Profile at BDFA 
 

1990 births
Living people
Argentine footballers
Argentine expatriate footballers
Rangers de Talca footballers
Club Atlético Colón footballers
Tiro Federal footballers
All Boys footballers
Club Atlético Huracán footballers
Instituto footballers
Chilean Primera División players
Primera B de Chile players
Argentine Primera División players
Primera Nacional players
Torneo Argentino A players
Torneo Federal A players
Expatriate footballers in Chile
Association football forwards
People from Esperanza, Santa Fe
Sportspeople from Santa Fe Province